HMS Pegasus was a Doterel-class screw composite 6-gun sloop launched on 13 June 1878. She was sold for scrap in 1892.

Design
The Doterel class were a development of the Osprey-class sloops and were of composite construction, with wooden hulls over an iron frame. The original 1874 design by the Chief Constructor, William Henry White was revised in 1877 by Sir Nathaniel Barnaby and nine were ordered. Of 1,130 tons displacement and approximately 1,100 indicated horsepower, they were capable of approximately 11 knots and were armed with two 7" muzzle loading rifled guns on pivoting mounts, and four 64-pound guns (two on pivoting mounts, and two broadside).  They had a crew complement of approximately 140 men.

Construction
Pegasus was laid down at Devonport Royal Dockyard in 1877 and launched on 13 June 1878. She was commissioned on 5 March 1879, and was classified as both a sloop of war and as a colonial cruiser. She was capable of attaining  under full steam or 15 knots under sail.

Service history
The primary purpose of ships of her class was to maintain British naval dominance through trade protection, anti-slavery, and long term surveying. Pegasus served on the China Station.

Occupation of Port Hamilton
With a view to forestalling Russian intentions, on 16 April 1885 Pegasus, Agamemnon and Firebrand occupied Port Hamilton, a small group of islands in the Jeju Strait off the southern coast of the Korean Peninsula. The base was demolished and the occupation ended on 27 February 1887 after the Russian threat had diminished.

Fate
Pegasus was sold to George Cohen for breaking on 11 August 1892.

References

 

Doterel-class sloops
Ships built in Plymouth, Devon
1878 ships
Victorian-era sloops of the United Kingdom